Les Roses de Dublin (Die Rosen von Dublin) is a French-German television series.

See also
List of French television series

External links

1981 French television series debuts
1981 French television series endings
Television shows set in the Republic of Ireland